Beinan Cultural Park is an archeological site in Taitung City, Taitung County, Taiwan. The park is the site for the largest and most complete prehistoric settlement ever discovered in Taiwan, with over 10,000 m2 and more than 1,600 burial sites.

Beinan Site

The earliest records of the prehistoric Beinan Site in Taitung City were made by Torii Ryūzō, an anthropologist in the early period of the Japanese rule. During his four visits to Taiwan for anthropological research, he took photos of the monolithic stone pillars at the site. 

This historic settlement area was discovered during the construction work of the back part of Taitung Station in 1980 when graveyard containing several thousand slate coffins was unearthed, with some bodies still laid within. Around 20,000 pieces of jade, pottery and stone tools were also found. This had caught the attention of the government to carry out archeological work and build a national museum to preserve the artifacts.

Beinan Cultural Park opened in 1997 to display and preserve the archaeological site, considered the most important one in Taiwan. An indoor/outdoor Museum of Prehistory opened in 2002.

Features
The park consists of and archeological site for visitors and the nearby National Museum of Prehistory which was opened in 2002.

Transportation
The park is accessible West from Taitung Station of the Taiwan Railways.

See also

 List of parks in Taiwan
 Prehistory of Taiwan
 National Museum of Prehistory (Taiwan)

References

1980 archaeological discoveries
1997 establishments in Taiwan
Archaeological sites in Taiwan
Buildings and structures in Taitung County
Parks in Taitung County